This is a list of the 12 members of the European Parliament for Croatia in the 2019 to 2024 session.

These MEPs were elected at the 2019 European Parliament election in Croatia.

List 

On the Croatian Democratic Union list (EPP Group)
Karlo Ressler
Dubravka Šuica – until 30 November 2019Sunčana Glavak – since 1 December 2019
Tomislav Sokol
Željana Zovko

On the Social Democratic Party of Croatia list: (S&D)
Tonino Picula
Biljana Borzan
Predrag Fred Matić
Romana Jerković – since 1 February 2020

On an Independent list: (Non-Inscrits)
Mislav Kolakušić

On the Croatian Conservative Party-led list: (ECR)
Ruža Tomašić

On the Human Shield list: (Non-Inscrits)
Ivan Vilibor Sinčić

On the Amsterdam Coalition list:
Valter Flego (IDS, Renew)

References

See also 

 List of members of the European Parliament, 2019–2024
 2019 European Parliament election
 Politics of Croatia

Lists of Members of the European Parliament for Croatia
Lists of Members of the European Parliament 2019–2024
MEPs for Croatia 2019–2024